The West Indies cricket team toured Sri Lanka in February and March 2020 to play three One Day International (ODI) and two Twenty20 International (T20I) matches. The full schedule for the tour was confirmed by Sri Lanka Cricket on 21 January 2020. The West Indies last toured Sri Lanka in October and November 2015.

On 19 February 2020, Sri Lanka named their ODI squad, with Dimuth Karunaratne returning as captain of the side. Lahiru Thirimanne had led the team in their previous ODI series, against Pakistan, but was dropped due to poor form. Sri Lanka won the first two ODIs, to give them an unassailable lead in the series. Sri Lanka won the final ODI by six runs, winning the series 3–0.

In the first T20I match, Kieron Pollard became the first cricketer to play in 500 Twenty20 matches. The West Indies won the T20I series 2–0.

Squads

During the ODI series, Nuwan Pradeep and Dhananjaya de Silva both suffered injuries and were ruled out of Sri Lanka's T20I squad. Asitha Fernando replaced Pradeep, but no replacement was named for de Silva.

Tour matches

One-day match: Sri Lanka Board President's XI vs West Indies

One-day match: Sri Lanka Board President's XI vs West Indies

ODI series

1st ODI

2nd ODI

3rd ODI

T20I series

1st T20I

2nd T20I

Statistics

Most runs (ODI)

Most wickets (ODI)

Most runs (T20I)

Most wickets (T20I)

Sri Lankan cricket team in South Africa in 2020-21

Notes

References

External links
 Series home at ESPN Cricinfo

2020 in Sri Lankan cricket
2020 in West Indian cricket
International cricket competitions in 2019–20
West Indian cricket tours of Sri Lanka